Jaak Reichmann (28 May 1874 Tarvastu Parish (now Viljandi Parish), Kreis Fellin – 1 May 1945 Tallinn) was an Estonian politician. He was a member of II Riigikogu, representing the Farmers' Assemblies.

1921-1922 he was Minister of Justice.

References

1874 births
1945 deaths
People from Viljandi Parish
People from Kreis Fellin
Estonian Lutherans
Farmers' Assemblies politicians
Justice ministers of Estonia
Members of the Riigikogu, 1923–1926
Members of the Estonian National Assembly